Ataata Moeakiola (born 6 February 1996 in Tonga) is a Tongan born, Japanese rugby union player. His playing position is wing. He most recently played for the Chiefs in 2019.

Moeakiola, originally from Tonga, having left Tonga aged just 15 thanks to a university rugby scholarship in Japan. he played for the Japan's U20 side at the World Rugby Under 20 Championship.

He gained major attention when he grabbed a spectacular hat-trick inside 30 minutes of a stunning performance against South Africa at the under-20 Rugby Championship in England.

Moeakiola signed for the Chiefs for the 2019 Super Rugby season and will look to make his debut in the competition.

He was named in the Japan squad for the 2019 Rugby World Cup and heads into the quarter finals of the tournament having made 4 caps.

Reference list

External links
 

1996 births
Tongan rugby union players
Japan international rugby union players
Tongan expatriates in Japan
Living people
Rugby union wings
Sunwolves players
Chiefs (rugby union) players
Kobelco Kobe Steelers players